The Botticellis were an American surf pop band founded in 2003 in Santa Cruz by Alexi Glickman, Zack Ehrlich, Burton Li, and Dave Tranchina.  Their 2008 debut record was released by Antenna Farm Records in 2008 to critical acclaim. NPR, Dusted Magazine, Allmusic, Pitchfork Media Daytrotter Crawdaddy!.

"Botticelli" is Italian for "little barrel." The Botticellis' sound has been described as "chamber pop" and likened to the California surf music of the 1960s  as well as post-Beatles pop groups like Big Star, Chris Bell,  Raspberries, ELO, George Harrison, Belle & Sebastian, Paul Simon and similar artists who are known to bring sophistication to pop composition.

The band dissolved in 2010, with its members pursuing separate musical projects.

Band members
Alexi Glickman
Burton Li
Jeremy Black
Steve Taylor

Past members
Zack Ehrlich
Dave Tranchina
Blythe Foster
Ian Nansen
Ryan Browne

Related projects
Apollo Sunshine
Burgers
Judgement Day
Little Wings
Lucky Cloud
Papercuts
Slumgum
Sonny & the Sunsets

Discography
"The Botticellis," 2004 Self-Released (CD)
"EP," 2006, Self-Released (CD)
Old Home Movies, 2008 Antenna Farm Records (CD/Digital), Rocinante Records (LP)
''Awaiting On You All/ Table by the Window," 2008 Bellevue Records (Single)

References

External links
official website
[ Allmusic profile of the Botticellis]
Dusted Magazine review of Old Home Movies
My Old Kentucky Blog interviews the Botticellis
NPR reviews Old Home Movies.
 Daytrotter live session No. 1
Slant Magazine review of OHM
Other Antenna Farm Records Artists

Living people
Indie rock musical groups from California
Indie pop groups from San Francisco
Musicians from Santa Cruz, California
Year of birth missing (living people)